Richard Irving (born 19 September 1969) is a New Zealand former cricketer. He played three first-class matches for Auckland between 1996 and 2001.

See also
 List of Auckland representative cricketers

References

External links
 

1969 births
Living people
New Zealand cricketers
Auckland cricketers
Cricketers from Christchurch